Adam Kili is a town in the Federally Administered Tribal Areas of Pakistan.

References

Populated places in Khyber Pakhtunkhwa